The Apastepeque Volcanic Field is in El Salvador, Central America.  The volcanic field is 8 kilometers north of a small town in central El Salvador called San Vicente.  The last eruption of the volcano is unknown, however scientists have concluded that it was around 10, 000 years ago.

Volcanic Speculations
Elevation: 700 m (2297 ft.)
Types: Cinder cone, lava dome, and maars
Coordinates:13.72°N 88.77°W 
Last eruption: Holocene

See also
List of volcanoes in El Salvador

References

External links

Volcanoes of El Salvador
Holocene volcanoes